Martin Leonard Caine (November 17, 1883 – April 7, 1953) was an American football player and coach.  He served as the head football coach at Villanova College—now known as Villanova University—in 1903. He compiled a record of 2–2 while serving as a senior player-coach. He died suddenly in 1953. He was Naugatuck, Connecticut's oldest practicing attorney and judge at the time of his death as well as a staunch supporter of the Democratic Party.

Head coaching record

References

1883 births
1953 deaths
20th-century American lawyers
Villanova Wildcats football coaches
Villanova Wildcats football players
Yale Law School alumni
People from Cheshire
People from Naugatuck, Connecticut
Connecticut lawyers
British emigrants to the United States